Patharpratima Mahavidyalaya, established in 2001, is an undergraduate college in Patharpratima, West Bengal, India. It is affiliated with the University of Calcutta.

Departments

Science
Mathematics

Arts and Commerce
Bengali
English
History
Geography
Political Science

Philosophy
Economics
Education
Commerce

See also 
List of colleges affiliated to the University of Calcutta
Education in India
Education in West Bengal

References

External links
Patharpratima Mahavidyalaya

University of Calcutta affiliates
Universities and colleges in South 24 Parganas district
Educational institutions established in 2001
2001 establishments in West Bengal